Felbrigg is a village and civil parish in the English county of Norfolk.

History
Felbrigg's name is of Viking origin and derives from the Old Norse for a plank bridge.

Felbrigg parish has been the site of the discovery of several Roman artefacts including pottery, coins, brooches and a figurine of Priapus. Despite this, no conclusive evidence of a Roman settlement has been identified.

In the Domesday Book, Felbrigg is listed as a settlement of 6 households in the hundred of North Erpingham. In 1086, the village formed part of the East Anglian estates of Roger Bigot.

Geography
According to the 2011 Census, Felbrigg has a population of 193 residents living in 93 households.

Felbrigg falls within the constituency of North Norfolk and is represented at Parliament by Duncan Baker MP of the Conservative Party. For the purposes of local government, the parish falls within the district of North Norfolk.

Felbrigg Woods is a Site of Special Scientific Interest and is mainly within the grounds and estate of Felbrigg Hall. The woods mainly consist of common beech trees, with many rare species of lichen.

St. Margaret's Church

Felbrigg's parish church is dedicated to Saint Margaret of Scotland and dates from the early fifteenth century with extensive nineteenth century restoration. St Margaret's has examples of memorials to historical owners of Felbrigg Hall, notably a carved plaque to William Windham (died 1696) by Grinling Gibbons and a carved bust of William Windham by Joseph Nollekens.

Felbrigg Hall

Felbrigg Hall was first built in the seventeenth century in Jacobean style, with an interior completed in Georgian. The hall was the home of the Windham and Ketton-Cremer families until the death of its last, heirless owner R. W. Ketton-Cremer when the property passed to the ownership of the National Trust.

Notable Residents
 V-Adm. Thomas Wyndham (1508-1554)- Royal Navy officer, explorer and navigator
 Sir John Wyndham (1558-1645)- English landowner
 Ashe Windham (1673-1749)- English landowner and politician
 William Windham (1717-1761)- English landowner
 William Windham (1750-1810)- English politician and landowner
 V-Adm. William Lukin (1768-1833)- Royal Navy officer and veteran of the Napoleonic Wars
 William H. Windham (1802-1854)- English politician
 Gen. Sir Charles Ash Windham (1810-1870)- British Army officer and politician
 William Frederick Windham (1840-1866)- English landowner
 R. W. Ketton-Cremer (1906-1969)- English biographer and historian

War Memorial
Felbrigg's war memorial takes the form of a stone Celtic cross on a square plinth located on the village green. The memorial lists the following names for the First World War:

 L-Cpl. James Thurston CdG (1892-1918), 1st Battalion, Border Regiment
 L-Cpl. Ernest A. Lambert (1892-1916), 9th Battalion, Royal Norfolk Regiment
 Pfc. Robert W. Cawston (d.1918), No. 1 Supply Depot, Royal Air Force
 Pvt. Charles F. Lawrence (d.1915), 1st Battalion, Royal Munster Fusiliers
 Pvt. Harry Durrant (1893-1917), 1st Battalion, Royal Norfolk Regiment
 Pvt. James D. Kettle (d.1916), 2nd Battalion, Royal Norfolk Regt.
 Pvt. Harry Ward (1897-1917), 1/5th Battalion, Royal Norfolk Regt.
 Pvt. George H. Lawrence (1894-1918), 7th Battalion, Royal Norfolk Regt.
 Pvt. John R. Grimes (1879-1915), 9th Battalion, Royal Norfolk Regt.
 Pvt. Charles Kettle (1884-1916), 9th Bn., Royal Norfolk Regt.
 Pvt. William Lambert (d.1918), 27th (Tyneside Irish) Battalion, Northumberland Fusiliers
 Pvt. Hugh A. Snowie (d.1918), 5th Battalion, Queen's Own Cameron Highlanders

St. Margaret's Church also has private memorial plaque to F/O Richard T. W. Ketton-Cremer of No. 30 Squadron RAF who was killed in action during the Battle of Crete on 31st May 1941.

References

External links

 
Villages in Norfolk
Civil parishes in Norfolk
North Norfolk